Geoffrey Simmonds (25 April 1909 – 27 November 1976) was a New Zealand cricketer. He played in three first-class matches for Canterbury in 1929/30.

See also
 List of Canterbury representative cricketers

References

External links
 

1909 births
1976 deaths
New Zealand cricketers
Canterbury cricketers
Cricketers from Auckland